Kampong Mulaut is village in Brunei-Muara District, Brunei, about  from the capital Bandar Seri Begawan. The population was 5,846 in 2016. It is one of the villages within Mukim Sengkurong.

Facilities 
Mulaut Primary School is the village primary school, whereas Pengiran Anak Puteri Amal Umi Kalthum Al-Islam Religious School is the village school for the country's Islamic religious primary education.

Pengiran Muda Abdul Mateen Mosque is the village mosque.

Kampong Mulaut is also home to Sengkurong Sixth Form Centre, one of the few sixth form colleges in the country.

References 

Mulaut